Corina is the name of the only studio album by the freestyle singer Corina. It was released on August 6, 1991, by Cutting Records, in conjunction with ATCO.

Track listing

Personnel / production
 Track 1 Arranged, Produced & Edited by Carlos "After Dark" Berrios.  Recording Engineer: Richard Joseph.  Mixed by Carlos Berrios & Butch Jones.  Carlos Berrios: Keyboards, Bass, Drums, Percussion
 Tracks 2 & 9 Arranged & Produced by Aldo Marin, Andy Hernandez & Guillermo Martinez.  Recording Engineer: Gary Filadelfo; assistance on track 2 by Craig Marcus, Derek Lategan & Eddie Sancho.  Mixed by Aldo Marin, Frankie Cutlass & Kieran Walsh; Track 9 mixed by Mike Rogers.  Andy Hernandez: Keyboards; Joey Moskowitz: Piano Solo, Additional Keyboards; Frankie Cutlass: Electric Bass, Drums, Percussion, Additional Keyboards
 Track 3 Produced by Aldo Marin.  Arranged & Mixed by Aldo Marin & Merv DePeyer.  Recording Engineers: Mike Rogers & Eddie Sancho.  David P. Scott: All Guitars; Merv DePeyer: Keyboards, Drums, Percussion; Aldo Marin: Drums, Percussion
 Track 4 Arranged & Produced by Albert Cabrera.  Recording Engineer: Rick Sparks.  Mixed by Aldo Marin & Mike Sparks.  Joey Moskowitz: Keyboards; Albert Cabrera: Drums, Percussion; Loriana Goldstein: Vocal Backing
 Tracks 5, 7 & 10 Arranged & Produced by Carlos Rodgers, with arrangements on all three tracks by Peter Zizzo.  Tracks 5 & 7 Recorded by Bart Hartglass, Carlos Rodgers & Gary Filadelfo.  Track 10 Recorded by Carlos Rodgers, Craig Marcus, Kieran Walsh, Leticia Daragoza, Louie Cruz, Tommy Uzzo; recording assistance on track 5 by Louie Cruz.  All 3 Tracks Mixed by Aldo Marin & Carlos Rodgers.  Peter Zizzo: Guitars, Keyboards, Vocal Backing on tracks 5 & 10; Mike Lorello: Keyboards on tracks 5 & 10; James "Jimmy G." Greco: Drums, Percussion; Lorine Bang, Tina Shafer: Vocal Backing on track 5; Carlos Rodgers, Nikki Gregoroff, "Pepper", Robert Torres, Tina Shafer: Vocal Backing on track 10
 Track 6 Arranged & Produced by Luis "Capri" Duprey & "Pepper", with additional production by Aldo Marin.  Recording Engineer: David Kumen.  Mixed By Aldo Marin & Mike Rogers.  David Kumen: Guitars; Luis Duprey, "Pepper": Keyboards, Drums, Percussion
 Track 8 Arranged & Produced by Aldo Marin, Glen Friscia & Nicky Kalliongis.  Recording Engineers: Bobby Gordon & Eddie Sancho.  Mixed by Mike Rogers.  Alec Shantzis & Johan Brunkvist: Keyboards

Publishing
 Track 1 Published by Corina Starr Sound/King Reyes Music/Berrios Publishing/Cutting Records Music (ASCAP)
 Track 2 Published by Corina Starr Sound/Swindle Pop/Synaptic Music/Cutting Records Music (ASCAP)
 Track 3 Published by Jonhans Music/It's Time Music (BMI)
 Track 4 Published by One Rascal Music/Box Of Rain Music/It's Time Music (BMI
 Tracks 5, 7 & 10 Published by PEZ Music (BMI)/Mister Rodgers (BMI)/It's Time Music (BMI)
 Track 6 Published by Corina Starr Sound/Purple Peppermint Sounds/Cutting Records Music (ASCAP)
 Track 8 Published by HTG Music/Grohdaphus Music, Inc./Magda Lane Music/Cutting Records Music (ASCAP)
 Track 9 Published by Corina Starr Sound/Swindle Pop/Synaptic Pop/Cutting Records Music (ASCAP)

Charts 
Album 

Singles - Billboard (North America)

References 

1991 debut albums
Atco Records albums